A state senator is a member of a state's senate in the bicameral legislature of 49 U.S. states, or a member of the unicameral Nebraska Legislature.

Description 
A state senator is a member of an upper house in the bicameral legislatures of 49 U.S. states or a member of the unicameral Nebraska Legislature.

History 
There are typically fewer state senators than there are members of a state's lower house; a senator's job is to represent the people at a higher level than a state representative in the lower house.  In the past, this meant that senators represented various geographic regions within a state, regardless of the population, as a way of balancing the power of the lower house, which was apportioned according to population. This system changed in 1963, when the Supreme Court of the United States ruled that state legislatures must apportion seats in both houses according to population. However, the single-member district system remained, and as a result, the State Senates became redundant bodies, as other solutions, such as abolition (as in Canada) or switching to statewide proportional representation (as in Australia) have not been adopted.

References